Marion Township is one of fourteen townships in Shelby County, Indiana. As of the 2010 census, its population was 1,923 and it contained 867 housing units.

Marion Township was named for Francis Marion, an army officer during the American Revolutionary War, known as the Swamp Fox.

Geography

Unincorporated communities

 Marion

References

External links
 Indiana Township Association
 United Township Association of Indiana

Townships in Shelby County, Indiana
Townships in Indiana